Couronne lochoise is a soft and creamy raw goat's milk cheese originating in the farmlands of the Loches area of Touraine in the Loire Valley, France. Its name literally translates to "Crown of Loches", which references its doughnut shape. Its texture and taste resembles that of buttered pastry.

See also
 List of goat milk cheeses

External links
Couronne Lochoise description
Another Couronne Lochoise description

Goat's-milk cheeses
French cheeses